, born Jessie Roberta Cowan, was a Scottish-Japanese businesswoman known as the wife of Masataka Taketsuru, the founder of Nikka Whisky.

Life
She was born into a doctor's family in Kirkintilloch, East Dunbartonshire, a town near Glasgow. Of four siblings, Rita was the oldest, followed by her sister Isabella Lillian "Ella" Cowan, the third daughter Lucy, who was 3 years younger than Ella, and finally their younger brother Campbell.

Masataka Taketsuru entered Scotland's Glasgow University in 1918 to study organic chemistry and applied chemistry. At that time Rita's younger sister Ella, enrolled at the University's medical faculty, requested Masataka to instruct her younger brother Campbell in Judo (Jiujitsu). Masataka and Rita then met at the Cowan house. Having expressed his love to Rita, Masataka then revealed to her his wish to help in "making real whisky in Japan".  They married in a simple ceremony at the register office in January 1920. After marrying, they moved to Japan that same year, and lived for a while in Osaka.

After Masataka opened the distillery in Yoichi in 1934 in Hokkaido, Rita continued to support him devotedly.

Although Rita was spared internment and allowed to stay in Yoichi during the Pacific War because she had become a Japanese citizen, the Kenpeitai kept her under constant surveillance as a suspected foreign spy. They even raided her home several times and accused her of having radio equipment to contact Allied submarines. After the attack on Pearl Harbor, neighbours turned against her, she was ignored in the street and children would throw rocks at her home.

In 1955 Rita suffered from liver disease and tuberculosis, and began spending the summers in Yoichi and the winters in Zushi, Kanagawa where Masataka stayed during his business trips to Tokyo. However, in the autumn of 1960 she returned to Yoichi, and died there in January 1961. She is buried in Yoichi together with her husband who later died in 1979.

Legacy 

Using the inheritance she received from relatives as funds, Rita established the "Rita Nursery".

National Route 229 in front of the main train station in Yoichi was renamed "Rita Road" in her honor.

The Yoichi Distillery contains the Rita House which is a Designated Tangible Cultural Property under Japanese law.

See also
 Massan an NHK morning TV drama series, in which American actress Charlotte Kate Fox portrays a character based on Rita.
 Tezukayama Gakuin University, the school where Rita worked as an English teacher
 Takeshi Taketsuru

References

External links
 http://www.scotchmaltwhisky.co.uk/nikkawhisky.htm

Scottish emigrants to Japan
Scottish expatriates in Japan
People from Kirkintilloch
People from Zushi, Kanagawa
1896 births
1961 deaths